Meenakshi Seshadri (born 16 November 1963) is a former Indian actress, model and dancer who worked primarily in Hindi films, with a few films in Telugu and Tamil. She made her debut with the film Painter Babu (1983) produced by Manoj Kumar. However, it was her second film Hero (1983) which catapulted her to instant stardom. In a career spanning a decade, she established herself as one of the most popular and highest-paid actresses of her time. 

Prior to her acting career, Seshadri won the Eve's Weekly Miss India contest in 1981 at the age of 17. She became one of Hindi cinema's leading actresses in the 1980s and 1990s, and was acknowledged for several of her performances, her beauty, and her accomplished dancing. She was noted for her performances in films including Hero (1983), Aandhi-Toofan (1985), Meri Jung (1985), Swati (1986), Dilwaala (1986), Dacait (1987), Inaam Dus Hazaar (1987), Parivaar (1987), Shahenshah (1988), Mahaadev (1989), Awaargi (1990), Jurm (1990), Ghayal (1990), Ghar Ho To Aisa (1990), Damini (1993), Duet (1994) and Ghatak (1996). She received particular critical acclaim for Swati (1986), Dahleez (1986), Satyamev Jayate (1987), Awaargi (1990) and Damini (1993). She also performed at the Khajuraho Dance Festival in the 1990s.

After the release of her film Ghatak, she left the film industry to raise her children in the United States with her husband, where she runs the Cherish Dance School. A documentary was made about her life, titled Meenakshi Accept Her Wings.

Early life
Meenakshi Seshadri was born on 16 November 1963 as Shashikala Seshadri in a Tamil Brahmin family in Sindri, Bihar (now in Jharkhand). She trained in four Indian classical dance forms, Bharata Natyam, Kuchipudi, Kathak, and Odissi, under Vempati Chinna Satyam and Jaya Rama Rao. She won the Eve's Weekly Miss India contest in 1981 at the age of 17 and represented India at the Miss International 1981 in Tokyo, Japan.

Career

Debut and early success (1983–1985)
After a forgettable debut in Painter Babu, Meenakshi acted alongside another newcomer, Jackie Shroff, in Hero. The film was a blockbuster and Meenakshi became an overnight star. Immediately after the success of Hero, she got an offer to star with superstar Rajesh Khanna. She appeared with Khanna in Awara Baap in a double role, but the film underperformed. She then appeared in several commercially unsuccessful films, including Love Marriage, Paisa Ye Paisa, and Lover Boy. Her next film, Bewafai, was again with Khanna, with Rajinikanth in an antagonist role. Then Ghai again cast her alongside Anil Kapoor in his next film, Meri Jung, which was one of the highest-grossing films of the year 1985. This gave her a major foothold in the industry. Some of her films were moderately successful, namely Swati, Mera Jawab, and Aandhi Toofan. She then appeared in the film Hoshiyar alongside Jeetendra. In the same year she acted with Rajinikanth in Mahaguru (1985) as his heroine. Later Meenaakshi did a special appearance song with Rajnikant in a Telugu movie Jeevana Poratam (1986).

Established actress (1986–1989) 
Seshadri appeared in many critically acclaimed films in 1986. In Swati, a woman-centric art house film, she performed the title role in an ensemble cast. The film gained immense critical acclaim and critics said, "Meenakshi Seshadri has acted in Swati the way Amitabh Bachchan acts in his films". That same year she appeared in B. R. Chopra films alongside Jackie Shroff' and Raj Babbar in the romantic drama Dahleez, which dealt with the taboo topic of infidelity but underperformed at the box office. Her other releases that year, such as Allah Rakha, was average performers at the box office. In 1987, she appeared in the hit film Inaam Dus Hazaar alongside Sanjay Dutt. She also appeared in Dacait, an action drama alongside Sunny Deol; it was critical acclaim.  Dilwala (1986) and Parivaarwith Mithun Chakraborty, film did very well at box office. Main Balwan (1986) was average in India, but Superhit in overseas. In 1988, she appeared in Yash Chopra's Vijay. In 1988, she appeared in Shahenshah alongside Amitabh Bachchan. The film was heavily hyped. After the great success of Shahenshah, Meenakshi teamed up with Bachchan for the films Toofan, Akayla, and Gangaa Jamunaa Saraswati, but all three were flops. In 1989, she was directed by Dev Anand in the film Sachché Ká Bol-Bálá In 1989, she made her Tamil film debut with En Rathathin Rathame, a remake of the Hindi film Mr. India, opposite K.Bhagyaraj, which bombed at the box office. In 1989, she appeared in the family drama Bade Ghar Ki Betiin the title role, and the family drama Gharana these were moderate successes.

She worked with fellow dancer Mithun Chakraborthy in Aandhi Toofan, Main Balwan, Dilwaala, Parivaar, Bees Saal Baad, Pyar Ka Karz, and Shandaar Her best and most successful pairing, as well as best on-screen her chemistry, is regarded to be with Anil Kapoor. Her pairings with Shroff, Rishi Kapoor, Sunny Deol, and Vinod Khanna are often also praised by the media. Her successful films with Anil Kapoor include Aag Se Khelenge, Meri Jung, Awaargi and Ghar Ho Toh Aisa, but others, such as Love Marriage, Amba, Joshilaay, Vijay, and Humlaa were box office duds. In Vijay she has a hot kissing scene with Anil Kapoor in a Fiat car and in Inteqam she tied a Rakhi to Anil Kapoor; the scene was also filmed in a Fiat. She would have acted with Anil Kapoor in more than nine films, but some planned films were never completed. Prakash Mehra announced Dhan Dhahej, starring Anil Kapoor and Meenakshi, and in 1988 Sanjay Khan announced the movie Sarzameen with Anil Kapoor, Meenakshi, and Vinod Khanna. That same year, Ramesh Sippy announced Aalishaan with Amitabh Bachchan and Meenakshi. Subhash Ghai signed Bachchan for the first time in film Devaa opposite Meenakshi Seshadri, but it was shelved after a song picturised on Bachchan and Shammi Kapoor the song sung by Mohammed Aziz.

Commercial success (1990–1996)
In 1990, Meenakshi appeared in two films by Mahesh Bhatt, the first being Awaargi, an art house film. Many critics call this her best performance. The second film was Jurm, released in the same year. The film was a critical and commercial success. Her role of a wife who has to face her problems after her husband gets involved with another woman gained immense critical praise. She received her first Filmfare Award nomination for best actress for her role in the film. She also appeared in the film Ghar Ho To Aisa opposite Anil Kapoor; the film was a hit and Meenakshi was noted for her comedic timing. 
She then appeared in Ghayal alongside Sunny Deol. This film started her long association with Rajkumar Santoshi.Ghayal was the highest-grossing film of the 1990s. In 1991, she appeared opposite Amitabh Bachchan in Akayla, directed by Ramesh Sippy; despite being well-promoted, the film flopped at the box office. Her on-screen pairing with Vinod Khanna was widely appreciated, and the pair starred in such successful films as Satyamev Jayate, Mahaadev, Jurm, Humshakal, and Police Aur Mujrim. She acted in the successful family drama Ghar Parivar in 1991, with Rajesh Khanna and Rishi Kapoor as her co-stars.

Meenakshi made her Telugu film debut with Brahmarshi Viswamitra in 1991. In 1992, she appeared in the Telugu film Aapadbandhavudu opposite Chiranjeevi. In 1992 her film Aaj Ka Goonda Raaj opposite Chiranjeevi was a hit. In 1993, she appeared in the film Damini – Lightning. Directed by filmmaker Rajkumar Santoshi, it also starred Rishi Kapoor, Sunny Deol, Amrish Puri, Tinnu Anand, and Paresh Rawal. The film depicted the sensitive subject of injustice towards a rape victim. She won many accolades for her performance in the film. Damini received a number of awards, including a National Film Award and a Filmfare Award nomination. Damini is regarded as Meenakshi's career-defining role. She performed a Tandav dance in the film, choreographed by Ravindra Atibudhi.

Meenakshi played the female lead in the 1996 film Ghatak: Lethal opposite Sunny Deol, directed by Rajkumar Santoshi. It was one of the highest-grossing films of 1996. This was her last film. After this film, she married and moved to the United States.

In 1992, she did the Telugu film Apathbandavudu with Chiranjeevi under the direction of K. Vishwanath. In 1993, she also appeared in Aadmi Khilona Hai opposite Govinda; and Kshatriya opposite Vinod Khanna – both the films were successful at the box office. In 1994, she was in a dance show of songs from Damini: "Bin Sajan Jhula Jholu" with Aamir Khan, and in 1991 Raj Kumar Santoshi started the film Dil Hai Tumhara with Sunny Deol. Meenakshi paired for the first time with Salman Khan; they only shot once before the film was shelved. She appeared in the Tamil film Duet opposite Prabhu Ganeshan, directed by K. Balachander.

Hiatus (1997–present)
After her marriage, she made a rare appearance on Shekhar Suman's talk show. After a few years of marriage, she shifted her base to Plano, Texas, in the United States. In an interview she stated: "Coming from a very Indo-centric background, life abroad shook me, I just could not relate to the US environment." However, with the passage of time she has settled there. Now she is running her own dance school in Carrollton called Cherish Institute of Dance; the school is described as "an assembly of talented dancers, a voluntary body to enhance multi-culture, revealing the best talent of people of all ages".

Personal life
She dated singer Kumar Sanu in the early 1990's. Meenakshi retired from cinema after marrying investment banker Harish Mysore in 1995. They had a civil wedding and a registered marriage in New York. The couple has two children, a daughter and a son. Meenakshi lives in Plano, Texas. There, she teaches Bharatanatyam, Kathak, and Odissi. She performs with her students at charity events and fundraisers, including the American Association of Physicians of Indian Origin (AAPI) convention in California.

Artistry

Dance
Meenakshi is not only known for her acting skills, but for her dancing skills as well. Often referred to as "Damini", she is famous for her dance in the song "Tu Mera Hero Hai" from the film Hero.  She is also known for her dance sequences to Bollywood songs such as "Pyar Karne Wale" (from Hero), her one of great dance sequences in songs such as "Rock’N’Roll" and "Tu Nache Main Gaoon" - with Mithun (from Main Balwaan" and 'Parivaar"), "Teri Payal Mere Geet" with Govinda (from Teri Payal Mere Geet), "Jaane Do Jaane Do" (from Shahenshah) opposite Amitabh Bachchan, "Badal Pe Chalke" (from Vijay) opposite Anil Kapoor and Rishi Kapoor, "Bin Saajan Jhula" (from Damini) opposite Aamir Khan, "Sajan Mera Uss Par Hai" (from Gangaa Jamunaa Saraswati), "Mujre Wali Hoon" (from Awaargi), "Jab Koi Baat Bigad Jaye" (from Jurm), and "Badan Main Chandni" (from Ghatak).

She considers herself more of a dancer than an actress. Her desire to continue the art and extend this culture in a foreign land led her to found the Cherish Dance School.

Singing
Meenakshi sang some poetic notes in J.P. Dutta's movie Kshatriya, in a composition by Laxmikant Pyarelal. She sang a song in another movie, Tadap, with Chunkey Pandey and Nana Patekar, but the movie was not released. She sang "Tumhare Roop ka", composed by R.D. Burman, with Amit Kumar and Suresh Wadkar.

Documentaries and television appearances
She has made few appearances on talk shows and rarely gives interviews. In 1987, she appeared in an interview in London, in which she discussed her personal and professional life.

In 1992, Meenakshi featured in the television documentary World of Film: India about the Indian film industry; she appeared with stalwarts such as Shashi Kapoor, Amitabh Bachchan, and Mira Nair.

In 1997, she made a rare public appearance on Shekhar Suman's talk show Movers & Shakers (TV series); this was also her last television appearance before she left the industry to raise her children. She discussed her entire career, her personal life, and her passion for dance and her stage performances.

In 2006, a documentary was made on her life called Meenakshi Accept Her Wings, directed by Margret Stephens; the two-hour musical documentary depicted the lifestyle transition from a dancer and actress to a homemaker. The movie gave a deeper insight to her life after quitting films and her successful marriage.

Awards and recognition
 1986 – Lux Award as Best Actress for Swati 1991 – Filmfare Nomination as Best Actress for Jurm 1992 – Filmfare Award South nomination as Best Actress – Telugu for Aapadbandhavudu 1994 – Filmfare Nomination as Best Actress for Damini 1993 – Filmfare Special Award for Damini 1993 – Smita Patil Memorial Award as Best Actress for Damini 1993 – Andhra Pradesh State Award as Best Actress for Aapadbandhavudu''

Filmography

Television

Documentary

References

External links 

1963 births
Living people
Indian film actresses
Actresses in Hindi cinema
Actresses in Tamil cinema
Actresses in Telugu cinema
Actresses from Jharkhand
Femina Miss India winners
Miss International 1981 delegates
Female models from Jharkhand
Dancers from Jharkhand
Women artists from Jharkhand
Performers of Indian classical dance
People from Dhanbad district
Indian expatriates in the United States
American actresses of Indian descent
20th-century Indian actresses
21st-century Indian actresses
20th-century Indian dancers
20th-century Indian women artists
Tamil actresses